Altenstadt an der Waldnaab is a municipality in the district of Neustadt an der Waldnaab in Bavaria, Germany. Bundesautobahn 93 (Regensburg - Hof) passes west of Altenstadt. It has a railway station on the Weiden–Oberkotzau railway.

References

Neustadt an der Waldnaab (district)